This article contains a complete list of Michelin starred restaurants in San Francisco Bay Area and Northern California since 2007. The San Francisco guide was the second North American city chosen to have its own Michelin Guide. Unlike the other U.S. guides which focus mainly in the city proper, the San Francisco guide includes all the major cities in the Bay Area: San Francisco, Oakland, San Jose and Berkeley, as well as Wine Country, which includes Napa and Sonoma. In 2019, the guide was expanded to cover the whole state of California.

2019-2021
The 2019-2021 Michelin Guides cover the entire state of California.  Due to the COVID-19 pandemic and wildfires in California, the French tire company's restaurant guide took a hiatus in 2020.

2007-2018 
The 2007 to 2018 Michelin Guides cover the San Francisco Bay Area.

References



Lists of restaurants

San Francisco
San Francisco Bay Area-related lists